Alastair Seeley (born 4 October 1979 in Carrickfergus) is a motorcycle road racer. During 2021, he competed in Northern Ireland, winning the Ulster Superbike and Supersport Championships.

At the close of North West 200 racing on 14 May 2022, Seeley had won 27 road races in the series.

During 2017, he competed in the inaugural British GP2 category within the British Supersport National Championship riding a Spirit motorcycle having a Triumph 675 engine.

He competed in the 2016 British Superbike Championship aboard a BMW S1000R, having switched from Tyco BMW in the Superstock class. He was the 2009 British Superstock champion and the 2011 British Supersport champion, and also has a strong record in road racing.

Early career
He began circuit racing in 2000 in club events in Northern Ireland. In 2002 he racked up 20 wins, including his first national 125cc win and several 600 and Open class wins. His main 2003 focus was the Regal Championship, in which he regularly finished in the top ten, while he also won the Wirral Club Wales 600 and Powerbike Championship.

Seeley first came to wider attention by taking two wins in the 600cc class of the British Superbike Championship's Mondello Park round in 2004. That year he also made his first appearance at the North West 200, and won a 6-hour Pembury endurance race for Team Twilight. In 2005 he won the Irish Superbike Championship and contested in various other races. He successfully defended this in 2006, also winning the Irish Supersport title and taking 2 top-five finishes in the 600cc class at the North West 200. He also did some racing in America.

Move to racing in Great Britain

Superstock 1000
For 2007 he moved to England finishing tenth overall in the British Superstock Championship on a Yamaha. He improved to fourth in 2008, also taking his first North West 200 victory in the Superstock class and winning the Monarch of Mondello title for the biggest payday of his career. In 2009 he dominated the championship for the Relentless TAS Suzuki team, winning the first nine rounds and sealing the title with three rounds to spare, regularly setting what would be competitive lap times on a Superbike. He finished the season with two outings on an Evo Class Suzuki GSX-R1000, doing enough to earn a full-time ride for them in the main class.

British Superbike Championship 2010
Seeley made a flying start to his 2010 campaign, qualifying third and finishing third and fourth in the opening meeting at the Brands Hatch Indy circuit. He scored consistent points in the early part of the season, although his second podium did not come until round 13 at Snetterton. He took his first win at the Brands Hatch Grand Prix circuit, in a rain-affected race, before failing to finish in the two Sunday races.

British Supersport Championship 2011–
For 2011 Seeley chose to stay with Relentless TAS Suzuki which meant that he was demoted to the supersport class.

Career statistics
Stats correct as of 9 July 2012

All Time

By championship

National Superstock 1000

British Superbike Championship

Notes
1. – Seeley qualified for "The Showdown" part of the BSB season, thus before the Croft round he was awarded 500 points plus the podium credits he had gained throughout the season. Podium credits are given to anyone finishing 1st, 2nd or 3rd, with 3,2 and 1 points awarded respectively.

British Supersport Championship

References

External links
 Official website

1979 births
Living people
People from Carrickfergus
Motorcycle racers from Northern Ireland
British Superbike Championship riders
British Supersport Championship riders